Charade is a 1984 Canadian animated film directed by John Minnis. The film won the Academy Award for Best Animated Short Film at the 57th Academy Awards. The film was animated by Minnis with Pantone markers on paper, during a single three-month summer term at Sheridan College.

Plot 
In front of a witless audience, a talented but unlucky gentleman competes in a game of charades against a savant who puts no effort to it and yet the audience still gets his right.

Cast 
John Minnis as Father, Beatrice, etc. (voice)

See also
Michael Mills
Independent animation
1984 in film

References

External links 

Charade on YouTube

1984 films
1984 animated films
1980s animated short films
1984 comedy films
Best Animated Short Academy Award winners
Canadian animated short films
Canadian comedy short films
English-language Canadian films
Canadian student films
Best Theatrical Short Film Genie and Canadian Screen Award winners
1980s English-language films
1980s Canadian films
1984 short films